Christmas at Camp 119 (Italian: Natale al campo 119) is a 1947 Italian comedy-drama film directed by Pietro Francisci and starring Aldo Fabrizi,  Vittorio De Sica and Peppino De Filippo. A group of Italian prisoners of war being held captive in California dream of life back home as they await their release.

It was shot at the Palatino Studios in Rome and on location in Naples, Milan, Florence and Venice. The film's sets were designed by the art director Gastone Medin.

Cast
Aldo Fabrizi as Giuseppe Mancini 
Vittorio De Sica as Don Vincenzino 
Peppino De Filippo as Gennarino Capece 
Carlo Campanini as Scapizzono 
Massimo Girotti as Nane 
Alberto Rabagliati as Alberto 
Carlo Mazzarella as Ignazio
Aldo Fiorelli as Guido 
Vera Carmi as The schoolteacher
Margherita Bagni as Donna Clara
Rocco D'Assunta as Lojacono 
Olga Villi as Mirella 
María Mercader as Fiammetta
Nando Bruno as Guide of Roma
Adolfo Celi as John 
Ave Ninchi as Miss Mancini
Giacomo Rondinella as The Neapolitan Singer
 Pietro De Vico

References

Bibliography
 Moliterno, Gino. The A to Z of Italian Cinema. Scarecrow Press, 2009.

External links

1947 films
1947 comedy-drama films
1940s Italian-language films
Italian black-and-white films
Italian comedy-drama films
Films directed by Pietro Francisci
Films set in California
Films shot at Palatino Studios
Minerva Film films
World War II prisoner of war films
1940s Italian films